Fenwick High School may refer to:

Fenwick High School (Oak Park, Illinois)
Bishop Fenwick High School (Franklin, Ohio)
Bishop Fenwick High School (Peabody, Massachusetts)
Fenwick High School in Lancaster, Ohio, renamed William V. Fisher Catholic High School

See also 
 Bishop Fenwick High School (disambiguation)